Bjorn Fratangelo (born July 19, 1993) is a professional American tennis player.

He won the boys' singles title at the 2011 French Open defeating Dominic Thiem. Fratangelo is only the second American out of three to win the event, following John McEnroe in 1977 and preceding Tommy Paul in 2015.

Early life
Fratangelo began playing tennis at age three. and is named after tennis champion Björn Borg. His father, Mario, is his coach. Fratangelo attended St. John the Baptist School in Plum, Pennsylvania until the 8th grade when he moved to Naples, Florida for training reasons, and was an online student of Barron Collier High School.

Junior career
Fratangelo won the boys' singles title at the 2011 French Open, beating Dominic Thiem in the final. The win propelled him to a career high of No. 2 in the junior rankings. He also played in the junior championship at the 2011 US Open, losing in the third round to eventual champion Oliver Golding in three sets.

Professional

Early years
Fratangelo has mainly played on the ITF Pro Circuit since 2009. He played sparsely in both 2009 and 2010, before playing on a much more regular basis in 2011. He made his first final in July 2011 in the USA F17 event in Pittsburgh, losing to Brian Baker in straight sets.

The following month, Fratangelo was given a wildcard for the 2011 US Open qualifiers, losing to Fritz Wolmarans in the first round of qualification.

He reached another final on the ITF Men's Circuit in May 2012, but lost in straight sets to Tennys Sandgren in Tampa, Florida.

In 2013, Fratangelo reached the semi-final in the USA F2 event in Sunrise, Florida, losing to eventual champion Robby Ginepri, and then won his first professional title the following week, beating Arthur De Greef in the final in Weston, Florida. He made his second final in as many weeks when he faced De Greef once again, but lost this time in Palm Coast, Florida.

2016-2017: First Grand Slam win and Top 100 debut

In April 2016, he won the 2016 French Open Wild Card Challenge by reaching the semifinals in Sarasota and winning the Savannah Challenger the following week. He put the wildcard to good use by defeating compatriot Sam Querrey in the 1st round of the French Open to crack the top 100 for the first time. His ranking of No. 99 came out on June 6, 2016, which was the 60th birthday of the man he was named after, Björn Borg. This was also his first career-match win in the main draw of a Grand Slam tournament.

Fratangelo reached the semifinals at the 2017 Hall of Fame Tennis Championships.

2021-2022: Mixed doubles debut and first doubles win at the US Open
He qualified at the 2021 French Open, before losing to Cameron Norrie.

At the 2021 US Open, Fratangelo made his debut in mixed doubles with Madison Keys, whom he began dating four years ago. He also paired in men’s doubles with Christopher Eubanks as wildcards where he reached the second round recording his first win in doubles in his career at a Grand Slam over Frances Tiafoe and Nicholas Monroe.

He secured his main draw spot at the 2022 French Open for a second consecutive year at this Major with a straight sets win over Nino Serdarušić.

ATP Challenger & ITF Futures Finals

Singles: 25 (12–13)

Doubles: 12 (2–10)

Junior Grand Slam finals

Boys' singles: 1 (1 title)

Singles performance timeline

''Current through the 2022 French Open.

References

External links
 
 

American male tennis players
French Open junior champions
Tennis players from Pittsburgh
1993 births
Living people
American people of Italian descent
Grand Slam (tennis) champions in boys' singles